Shyamkumari Devi was an Indian politician. She was a Member of Parliament, representing Madhya Pradesh in the Rajya Sabha the upper house of India's Parliament representing the Indian National Congress.

References

Rajya Sabha members from Madhya Pradesh
Indian National Congress politicians from Madhya Pradesh
Women in Madhya Pradesh politics
1910 births
1984 deaths
Women members of the Lok Sabha
Women members of the Rajya Sabha
Lok Sabha members from Madhya Pradesh